The Community of the Lamb is a Roman Catholic religious institute. It consists of two branches, the Little Sisters of the Lamb and the Little Brothers of the Lamb. Since 1996, Cardinal Christoph Schönborn OP, Archbishop of Vienna, Austria has been the bishop responsible for the Community.

History
The Little Sisters of the Lamb were founded in Southern France. They were recognized by Jean Chabbert, Archbishop of Perpignan, on 6 February 1983. The Little Brothers were founded on 8 August 1990. The Community of the Lamb currently has little monasteries in France, Spain, Italy, Germany, Austria, Poland, Argentina, Chile, and the United States.

Spirituality
The community is shaped both by the Dominican and Franciscan spirituality, uniting the proclamation of the Gospel through preaching with commitment to the poor. The motto of the community is: "Wounded, I will never cease to love."

References

External links
 Official website

Catholic Church in France
Christian organizations established in 1983
Catholic religious institutes established in the 20th century
1983 establishments in France